James v United Kingdom [1986] is an English land law case, concerning tenants' (lessees') statutory right to enfranchise a home from their freeholder (ultimate landlord) and whether specifically that right, leasehold enfranchisement, infringes the freeholder's human rights in property without being in a valid public interest.

The plenary session of the court unanimously confirmed that even if it can be shown such enfranchisement deprives a natural or legal person of their "peaceful enjoyment of their possessions" the above procedure is in the public interest and strictly subject to the conditions provided for by the law of England and Wales.  The rights are effected (enacted) in pursuance of legitimate social policies and so meet the exception expressly in Article 1 of Protocol No. 1 to the (European) Convention on Human Rights.

The court clarified on housing policy: "Eliminating what are judged to be social injustices is an example of the functions of a democratic legislature. More especially, modern societies consider housing of the population to be a prime social need, the regulation of which cannot entirely be left to the play of market forces."

Facts
All the trustees of a monetarily vast, multi-property estate passing under the will of Hugh Grosvenor, 2nd Duke of Westminster, including Gerald Grosvenor, 6th Duke of Westminster, argued they had been deprived in law of their underlying (reversionary) ownership of about 215 residential properties. They alleged the law of England and Wales contravened their human right to property under ECHR Protocol 1, article 1. Tenants had exercised statutory right to buy outright their long leasehold property converting it to a freehold. In this case expensive property being part of Grosvenor's estates in Mayfair and Belgravia in London. They did so as permitted and procedurally governed by the Leasehold Reform Act 1967.

The Act has remained in effect since Labour's Second Wilson Ministry. It enables leasehold houses to be converted, without objection, to freeholds (also known as "enfranchised") if the occupier (commonly considered the owner as a matter of practice under English long leases but not in law) follows a procedure.  The procedure includes payment of the theoretical value on the market for that freehold (if sold to a third party subject to the remaining occupier's term of years — the lease).  The Act seeks to enable lessees to compensate for expensive property loss (or cost of lease renewal) experienced by each lessee over a long period, as in paragraph 13 of the Court's judgment:
"The lease, however, is a wasting asset. As a lease progresses, the value of the tenant’s interest in the property diminishes, whilst the value of the landlord’s interest increases. At the end of the lease, the tenant’s interest ceases to exist and the buildings, including improvements and repairs made, revert to the landlord without any compensation to the tenant."

Judgment
The European Court of Human Rights held the Leasehold Reform Act 1967 did not breach the Convention since the Act is within the limits that a national legislature has in implementing social policies.

See also

English land law

Notes and references

References

Notes

English land case law
European Court of Human Rights cases involving the United Kingdom
1986 in British law
1986 in case law